Born Here Live Here Die Here is the seventh studio album by American country music singer Luke Bryan. It was released on August 7, 2020, by Capitol Nashville. The album includes the singles "Knockin' Boots", "What She Wants Tonight", "One Margarita", and "Down to One". A deluxe edition with six extra songs, including the album's fifth single "Waves" and its sixth single, "Up", was released on April 9, 2021.

The album debuted at number five on the US Billboard 200  and number one on the US Top Country Albums charts, earning 65,000 album-equivalent units (of which 48,000 were pure album sales) in its first week.

Background
"Knockin' Boots" was released on April 8, 2019 as the debut single from Bryan's seventh studio album. "What She Wants Tonight" was released on October 24, 2019 as the second single. In January 2020 during an Instagram Live video, Bryan announced the name of the album would be Born Here Live Here Die Here. In February 2020, Bryan released the title track, the album's track listing and announced it would be released on April 24, 2020. On March 13, 2020, "One Margarita" was released, and it would later be sent to country radio on April 13, 2020, after Capitol Nashville and Bryan postponed the album's release to August 7, 2020 due to the COVID-19 pandemic. On June 12, 2020, Bryan released the track "Build Me a Daddy" along with a music video for the song.

Commercial performance
Born Here Live Here Die Here debuted at number five on the US Billboard 200 chart, earning 65,000 album-equivalent units (of which 48,000 were pure album sales) in its first week. This became Bryan's eleventh US top-ten album. The album also debuted at number one on the US Top Country Albums chart, becoming Bryan's ninth number one album on this chart.

Track listing

Personnel
Credits adapted from Tidal.

Musicians

 Luke Bryan – lead vocals
 Perry Coleman – background vocals  
 J. T. Corenflos – electric guitar  
 David Dorn – keyboards 
 Eddy Dunlap – pedal steel , dobro  
 Kyle Fishman – programming 
 Mark Hill – bass guitar  
 Evan Hutchings – drums , percussion  
 Kirk "Jellyroll" Johnson – harmonica 
 Charlie Judge – keyboards , Hammond B3 , Wurlitzer electric piano 
 Rob McNelley – electric guitar  

 Jake Mitchell – electric guitar 
 Greg Morrow – drums  
 Chancie Neal – background vocals 
 Justin Ostrander – electric guitar 
 Matt Rogers – background vocals 
 Adam Shoenfeld – electric guitar
 Jody Stevens – programming , acoustic guitar , electric guitar , banjo , bass guitar 
 Ilya Toshinskiy – acoustic guitar , banjo 
 Derek Wells – electric guitar 
 John Willis – acoustic guitar , mandolin 

Technical
 Adam Ayan – mastering engineer
 Derek Bason – mixer, recording engineer
 Chris Small – assistant recording engineer , editor , assistant mixer

Charts

Weekly charts

Year-end charts

Certifications

References

2020 albums
Luke Bryan albums
Capitol Records Nashville albums
Albums postponed due to the COVID-19 pandemic